Qawi (Quechua for to put into the sun, hispanicized spelling Jahui) is a mountain in the Andes of Peru, about  high. It is located in the Lima Region, Huaura Province, Santa Leonor District, in the Oyón Province, Oyón District, and in the Pasco Region, Pasco Province, Huayllay District.

References

Mountains of Peru
Mountains of Lima Region
Mountains of Pasco Region